Count Josias II of Waldeck-Wildungen (31 July 1636Jul. – 8 August 1669Greg.), official titles: Graf zu Waldeck und Pyrmont, Herr zu Tonna, was since 1660 Count of . However, he was primarily a military man.

Biography
Josias was born in Wildungen on 31 July 1636Jul. as the second son of Count Philip VII of Waldeck-Wildungen and Countess Anne Catherine of Sayn-Wittgenstein. After his father's death in 1645, Christian Louis, Josias’ eldest brother, succeeded him. Christian Louis was under the regency of his mother until 1660.

Josias was first in the service of Elector Frederick William of Brandenburg, under whom he was colonel of infantry in 1655 and fought as a major general in the Battle of Warsaw in 1656. In 1660 he was Överste in Swedish service. In 1663 he took part in the Austro-Turkish War as imperial Generalfeldwachtmeister and was wounded by an arrow at Fünfkirchen.

In 1665, as major general, Josias took over the command of the Brunswick-Lüneburg armed forces – consisting of four regiments of cavalry, two regiments of infantry, some artillery and some guard companies – from Duke George William of Brunswick-Lüneburg. Subsequently, in 1668 George William transferred three infantry regiments to the Republic of Venice for the war on the island of Crete, whose capital Kandia was under heavy siege by the Turks. Josias was given the supreme command of these 3300 men and marched to Venice late in the autumn of that year. On 28 March 1669 he embarked and on 12 May he landed on the island. During the defence against the attacks of the besiegers, after having previously been wounded in the arm, he suffered another dangerous wound in the leg due to a shrapnel on 6/16 July. The prevailing heat and the state of mind, resulting from quarrels with the Commander-in-Chief, Captain General Morosini, aggravated his condition and on 8 August around midnight he died in Kandia. His body was first buried in the St. Catherine’s Church in Kandia and then moved to Wildungen.

As his sons had already died, after Josias' death, the districts of Wildungen, Wetterburg and Landau came back into the possession of his brother Christian Louis.

Marriage and issue
Josias married at Arolsen Castle on 26 January 1660 to Countess Wilhelmine Christine of Nassau-Siegen (1629 – Hildburghausen, 22 January 1700), the youngest daughter of Count William of Nassau-Siegen and Countess Christiane of Erbach.
Josias and Wilhelmine Christine were closely related. Elisabeth of Nassau-Siegen, Josias’ grandmother, was the eldest sister of Wilhelmine Christine’s father. Also from his mother’s side, Josias was related to Wilhelmine Christine. His great-grandmother, also named Elisabeth of Nassau-Siegen, was a younger sister of Count John VI ‘the Elder’ of Nassau-Siegen, the great-grandfather of Wilhelmine Christine. Agnes of Wied, the great-great-grandmother of Josias, was a daughter of yet another Elisabeth of Nassau-Siegen, a younger sister of Count William I ‘the Rich’ of Nassau-Siegen, who was also the great-great-grandfather of Wilhelmine Christine. Finally, both Wilhelmine Christine and Josias descended from Count Wolrad I of Waldeck-Waldeck, Wilhelmine Christine through her grandmother Magdalene of Waldeck-Wildungen.

From the marriage of Josias and Wilhelmine Christine, the following children were born:
 Eleonore Louise (Arolsen Castle, 9 July 1661 – Arolsen Castle, 25 August 1661).
 William Philip (Arolsen Castle, 27 September 1662 – Arolsen Castle, 29 December 1662).
 Charlotte Dorothy (Arolsen Castle, 9 October 1663 – Arolsen Castle, 10 December 1664).
 Charlotte Joanne (Arolsen Castle, 13 December 1664 – Hildburghausen, 1 February 1699), married in Maastricht on 2 December 1690 to Duke John Ernest of Saxe-Saalfeld (Gotha, 22 augustus 1658 – Saalfeld, 17 December 1729).
 Sophie Wilhelmine (Arolsen Castle, 24 September 1666 – 13 February 1668).
 Maximilian Frederick (Arolsen Castle, 25 April 1668 – Arolsen Castle, September 1668).
 William Gustavus (Arolsen Castle, 25 April 1668 – Arolsen Castle, 21 May 1669).

Known descendants
Josias has several known descendants. Among them are:
 the monarchs Victoria, Edward VII, George V, Edward VIII, George VI, Elizabeth II and Charles III of the United Kingdom,
 the kings Leopold I, Leopold II, Albert I, Leopold III, Baudouin I, Albert II and Philippe I of the Belgians.
 the tsars Ferdinand I, Boris III and Simeon II of Bulgaria.
 the kings Ferdinand II, Pedro V, Luís I, Carlos I and Manuel II of Portugal,
 Grand Duke Henri I of Luxembourg.

Ancestors

Notes

References

Sources
 
 
 
 
 
 
 
 
 
 
 
 
 
  (1882). Het vorstenhuis Oranje-Nassau. Van de vroegste tijden tot heden (in Dutch). Leiden: A.W. Sijthoff/Utrecht: J.L. Beijers.

External links

 Descendants of Wolrad I Gf von Waldeck in Waldeck. In: Genealogy.eu by Miroslav Marek.
 Waldeck. In: An Online Gotha, by Paul Theroff.

1636 births
1669 deaths
Josias 02
German generals
People from Bad Wildungen
17th-century German military personnel
Military personnel from Hesse